Allan Taylor (born 28 November 1984) is an English professional snooker player, who comes from Basildon, Essex but resides in Southend. He used to work at a police station in Birkenhead, supporting the police force by studying CCTV footage.

Taylor turned professional in 2013 after being the sixth highest ranked amateur on the PTC Order of Merit, winning a tour card for the 2013–14 and 2014–15 seasons. He then remained on tour until 2019, however upon finishing outside the top 64 he lost his tour card and was unable to re-qualify for the tour through Q School.
He practices and prepares in St Mary's Mens Club.

Career

Debut season
Taylor won just two matches during the 2013–14 season to end his first season on tour ranked world number 123.

2014/2015 season
Taylor lost 6–2 to Anthony McGill in the first round of the UK Championship. A few weeks later he beat Michael Holt 4–3 to qualify for the Indian Open, where he was defeated 4–3 by Li Hang in the first round. At the end of the season Taylor was the world number 107 which would have seen him lose his place on the tour, however he finished 62nd on the European Order of Merit which earned him one of the eight two-year cards on offer for non-qualified players.

2015/2016 season
A 5–2 win over Simon Dent and successive last frame deciders against Stuart Carrington and Li Hang saw Taylor reach the final qualifying round for the 2015 Australian Goldfields Open in which he made a 132 break against Mark King, but lost 5–4. He could not win another match until February when, at the Welsh Open, he tasted victory at the venue stage of a ranking event for the first time in his career by defeating Oliver Lines 4–1. Taylor lost 4–2 to Anthony Hamilton in the second round.

2016/2017 season
Taylor qualified for the 2016 Riga Masters, World Open and Indian Open, but was knocked out in the first round of each. He lost in the second round of the Northern Ireland Open and Welsh Open 4–2 to Li Hang and 4–1 to Robin Hull respectively. At the Gibraltar Open, Taylor advanced to the last 32 of a ranking event for the first time with wins over Saqib Nasir and Elliot Slessor. He moved 3–2 ahead of Shaun Murphy, but would be defeated 4–3. Taylor needed to come through Q School to remain on tour as he lost his spot at the end of the season, due to his world ranking of 86. In the last 16 of the first event he needed a snooker when 3–2 down to Daniel Ward. He got it when Ward went in-off and made a 96 in the deciding frame, before whitewashing Sean O'Sullivan 4–0 to earn a new two-year tour card.

Performance and rankings timeline

Career finals

Amateur finals: 2 (2 titles)

References

External links

 
Allan Taylor at worldsnooker.com

Living people
1984 births
Snooker players from Liverpool
Sportspeople from Basildon
English snooker players